Hibbertia commutata is a species of flowering plant in the family Dilleniaceae and is endemic to the south-west of Western Australia. It is a low, erect, many-branched shrub with narrow elliptic to narrow egg-shaped leaves, and yellow flowers with fifteen to thirty stamens arranged around three carpels.

Description
The flowers are sessile,  in diameter with silky-hairy sepals and fifteen to thirty stamens alternating with the three glabrous carpels. Flowering occurs between July and November.

Taxonomy
Hibbertia commutata was first formally described by the botanist Ernst Gottlieb von Steudel in 1845 in Johann Georg Christian Lehmann's  Plantae Preissianae. The specific epithet (commutata) means "changed" or "altered", referring to the variability of the leaves.

The name H. commutata was partly misapplied to Hibbertia pilosa in Wheeler's 1987 publication, Flora of the Perth Region.

Distribution and habitat 
This hibbertia grows in lateritic soils and is widely distributed in the south-west of Western Australia, occurring in the Avon Wheatbelt, Esperance Plains, Jarrah Forest, Swan Coastal Plain and Warren biogeographic regions.

See also
List of Hibbertia species

References

commutata
Flora of Western Australia
Plants described in 1845
Taxa named by Ernst Gottlieb von Steudel